Isaac  Enenbiyo Orama (born 6 December 1956) was the Anglican Bishop of Uyo in Niger Delta Province from 2006 until his death after a long illness in 2014.

Orama was born on 6 December  1956 at Ekwu in Bayelsa State. He attended Government Comprehensive Secondary School, Port Harcourt, followed by  the Rivers State College of Technology where he gained an HND  in Business Administration (1981) and an MBA in 1991. He graduated from Trinity Theological College, Umuahia in 1994.

He was a lecturer at  Rivers State University for over ten years. He was made the first Archdeacon of Port  Harcourt West Archdeaconry by Samuel Onyeuku Elenwo.

He was elected Bishop on 16 September 2006,  consecrated on 26 November 2006 at Abuja and enthroned as the Bishop of Uyo on 1 December 2006.

He was quoted in 2007 as describing homosexuals as "inhuman, insane, satanic and not fit to live", remarks which he denied after the involvement of Rowan Williams, Archbishop of Canterbury.

References 

1956 births
2014 deaths
Anglican bishops of Uyo
21st-century Anglican bishops in Nigeria
Nigerian Anglicans
Trinity Theological College, Umuahia alumni
Rivers State University alumni
Academic staff of Rivers State University
People from Bayelsa State